Anime Central was a British television channel owned by CSC Media Group. The channel launched on 13 September 2007. It was first announced on 5 August 2007, though its license first appeared on the Ofcom website in January (initially named "Toon TV", this was changed to Anime Central in June). The channel ran from 9pm to 6am, free-to-air on Sky's Digital TV Platform, channel 199; and it was the only channel broadcast in the UK and Ireland which was dedicated solely to showing anime.

Anime was only broadcast between 9pm and 6am.  The channel originally timeshared with Pop Girl (another CSC Media Group channel) but more bandwidth was made available removing the need for the channel to timeshare. The extra broadcast capacity was then filled with the channel ident or teleshopping. The channel was shut down on 27 August 2008 being replaced with Showcase TV but Anime Central continued to be shown as a programming block on Showcase TV every night between 4am and 6am.  Showcase TV was renumbered to channel 188 in September 2008. On August 3, 2009, Showcase TV became True Entertainment and the Anime Central programming block was removed completely.

Programming
The regular schedule comprised six series, with a different episode broadcast every day.  These made a three-hour block, which was then repeated twice through to 6:00am.  Each series was usually repeated once before a major schedule change was made, unless the series was much longer than the standard length of 26 episodes. On 1 March 2008, the schedule changed, first to three double-bills, then to two triple-bills. The reasons for the change were unknown and reactions to this change on the channel's forum were generally negative.

Initially the channel did not broadcast in anamorphic widescreen. Programmes made in 16:9 format were screened in letterboxed format. In 2008, a few late-season episodes of Ghost In the Shell: Stand Alone Complex: 2nd Gig were screened in 16:9 anamorphic.

Anime programmes that aired on AnimeCentral
Bleach
Cowboy Bebop
Fullmetal Alchemist
Ghost in the Shell: Stand Alone Complex (1st GIG)
Ghost in the Shell: Stand Alone Complex (2nd GIG)
G.I. Joe: A Real American Hero
Gundam SEED
.hack//SIGN
Planetes
s-CRY-ed
Transformers: The Headmasters
Transformers: Super-God Masterforce
Transformers: Victory
Vision of Escaflowne
Witch Hunter Robin
Wolf's Rain

Christmas marathons
Over the 2007 Christmas season, from 21 December 2007 until 4 January 2008, the regular schedule was replaced by marathons of these 3 popular anime shows:
Cowboy Bebop (21 December 2007 – 23 December 2007)
Fullmetal Alchemist (24 December 2007 – 29 December 2007)
Bleach (30 December 2007 – 4 January 2008)
Nine consecutive episodes of a series were shown each day to form a 4½ hour block, except on the final day of each series' marathon which had fewer episodes.  Each block was repeated until 6:00am.

Subtitling
Although all series were initially broadcast in English, a popular topic of discussion on the Anime Central forums were member's preferences for Anime dubbed into English or in Japanese with English subtitles. Perhaps as a result of the high demand for both, during late 2007, the last repeat of the night of Cowboy Bebop and .hack//SIGN were broadcast in Japanese with English subtitles.

On-screen identity
Throughout the channel's life, it had a consistent red-on-black theme.  All the channel's advertising, the "bumpers", the ident cards and the website used this same theme.  In response to a request from the channel's brand manager, there was some discussion on the Anime Central Forums about possibly changing the red-on-black theme (amongst other suggestions about programming).  However, none of the suggestions were taken up by the channel.

Closure and replacement
In June 2008, an updated list of UK TV licenses from OFCOM no longer listed Anime Central as a licensed channel, reinforcing the long-standing speculation on the Anime Central forums that Anime Central would soon close.  However, the same OFCOM data indicated that CSC Media Group is set to start True Entertainment, prompting further speculation on the Anime Central Forums that some of Anime Central's programming could move to True Entertainment.  That same month, confirmation that Anime Central's license to operate was being replaced in favour of True Entertainment, had appeared on OFCOM's monthly updates page for May 2008.  Despite a fleeting suggestion on Sky's Electronic Programme Guide that a new schedule, combining content from Pop Girl, True Movies 2 and Anime Central, might start in August 2008, Sky's EPG quickly reverted to the previous schedule of triple bills and teleshopping. In August 2008, True Entertainment's OFCOM Licence was renamed to Showcase TV and Showcase TV launched the following day. Anime Central survived as a 3-hour block of programming from 12am to 3am, using Anime Central's original idents, DOG and continuity announcements. At the beginning of the new schedule the block carried the same triple bills of Cowboy Bebop and Ghost in the Shell: Stand Alone Complex that were previously seen in rotation on the full-time channel, however, in October 2008, Anime Central's slot was further reduced to two hours, showing double bills of Cowboy Bebop and Ghost in the Shell: Stand Alone Complex. In August 2009, the last double bills of Cowboy Bebop and Ghost In The Shell were shown and Showcase TV was replaced by True Entertainment.

In 2014, Sony Pictures Television bought CSC Media Group. In March 2015, Scuzz launched Animax Movie Nights, a weekly block that aired anime movies on Thursday nights until April 2015. The website was redirected to animaxtv.co.uk, which was launched in October 2013 prior to Sony's acquisition of CSC. However, it is no longer available due to the service's closure in October 2018. Currently, anime are only now being on Funimation streaming service in UK and Ireland.

Forum activity
Even though the channel no longer existed as a separate channel, discussion on the channel's internet forum continued with a low level of activity.  However, the forum stopped accepting new members in September 2008, and coupled with the discovery by forum members that the domain name registration will expire in November 2009, it has fueled speculation that the forum will soon close completely.

In August 2009, the forums were closed to members and non members, those who tried to access the forums would receive the message "Closed for cleanup and restructuring".

References

External links

CSC Media Group
Defunct television channels in the United Kingdom
Anime television
Television channels and stations established in 2007